The Central Middle School on Seventh St. in Devils Lake, North Dakota was built in 1936. It was designed by architects John Marshall of Devils Lake and Nairne W. Fisher of St. Cloud, Minnesota in Art Deco style. The school was listed on the National Register of Historic Places (NRHP) in 2003 as the Central High School.

According to its NRHP nomination, the school "is a locally prominent landmark that derives its significance from two principal areas: Education and Architecture...for its role in the development of the Devils Lake School System [and]...for being an excellent and rare
example of a high architectural style, Art Deco, in Devils Lake."

It includes a 1964-installed central clock system that rings bells and controls clocks in all classrooms, replacing usage of a pendulum-regulated, original, 1936 clock, which remains in place in a basement below the main office.

References

External links

Art Deco architecture in North Dakota
School buildings completed in 1936
School buildings on the National Register of Historic Places in North Dakota
National Register of Historic Places in Ramsey County, North Dakota
Schools in Ramsey County, North Dakota
Middle schools in North Dakota
1936 establishments in North Dakota